The Monongahela River, sometimes referred to locally as the Mon, is a  river on the Allegheny Plateau in north-central West Virginia and Southwestern Pennsylvania. The river flows from the confluence of its west and east forks in north-central West Virginia northeasterly into southwestern Pennsylvania, then northerly to Pittsburgh and its confluence with the Allegheny River to form the Ohio River. The river includes a series of locks and dams that makes it navigable.

Etymology
The Unami word Monongahela means "falling banks", in reference to the geological instability of the river's banks. Moravian missionary David Zeisberger (1721–1808) gave this account of the naming: "In the Indian tongue the name of this river was Mechmenawungihilla (alternatively spelled Menawngihella), which signifies a high bank, which is ever washed out and therefore collapses."

The Lenape Language Project renders the word as Mënaonkihëla (pronounced ), translated "where banks cave in or erode", from the verbs mënaonkihële "the dirt caves off" (such as the bank of a river or creek, or in a landslide) and mënaonke (pronounced ), "it has a loose bank" (where one might fall in).

Monongalia County and the town of Monongah, both in West Virginia, are named for the river, as is the city of Monongahela in Pennsylvania. (The name "Monongalia" is either a Latinized adaptation of "Monongahela" or simply a variant spelling.)

Variant names
The USGS name for the river is the Monongahela River; there have been numerous alternate names, alternate spellings and misspellings in historical texts.

Geography
The Monongahela is formed by the confluence of the West Fork River and its "east fork"—the Tygart Valley River—at Fairmont in north central West Virginia. From there it flows northeasterly to cross the Pennsylvania border just west of north Cheat Lake on its Cheat River tributary. Then it flows northerly across southwestern Pennsylvania, taking a bit of a detour northeast 10 miles south of Pittsburgh to approach Pittsburgh from the southeast and its confluence with the Allegheny River to form the Forks of the Ohio at "The Point" of Point State Park in Downtown Pittsburgh.

Geology
Prior to early Pleistocene regional glaciation, more than 780,000 years ago, the ancestral Monongahela River (a.k.a. the Pittsburgh River) flowed northward from present-day north-central West Virginia, across western Pennsylvania and northwestern Ohio, and into the Saint Lawrence River watershed. One (or more) extensive ice sheet advance dammed the old north-flowing drainage and created a vast lake—known as Lake Monongahela—stretching from an unknown point north of present-day Beaver, Pennsylvania for ~ south to Weston, West Virginia.

Hydrography
Via the Ohio River, the river is part of the Mississippi watershed which drains to the Gulf of Mexico on the Atlantic Ocean.

The river's length is 130 miles, its drainage basin is 7,340 sq.mi. and the average 30-year discharge at Elizabeth, Pennsylvania, is 9,109 cfs. It falls 3,831 ft. in elevation from its highest source to its mouth on the Ohio River.  It falls 280 feet from its forks to its mouth, a stretch made navigable by locks.  The mean depth is about 20 ft.

In southwestern Pennsylvania, the Monongahela is met by two major tributaries: the Cheat River, which joins at Point Marion, and the Youghiogheny River, which joins at McKeesport.

Major tributaries include: Becks Run, Big Sandy Creek, Buffalo Creek, Cheat River, Crooked Run, Deckers Creek, Dunkard Creek, Lick Run, Middle Fork River, Paw Paw Creek, Peters Creek, Streets Run, Turtle Creek, Tygart Valley River, West Fork River, Youghiogheny River.

Locks and dams

All dams are operated by the Pittsburgh District Army Corps of Engineers. In 2006, the navigation system, operated by the U.S. Army Corps of Engineers, had nine dam-locks along  of waterway.
Braddock Locks & Dam 	
Locks & Dam 3
Locks & Dam 4 
Maxwell Lock & Dam 	
Grays Landing Lock & Dam 
Point Marion Lock and Dam 
Morgantown Lock and Dam 	 
Hildebrand Lock and Dam 	 
Opekiska Lock and Dam

Ecology
According to the EPA's Toxics Release Inventory for 2010, the Monongahela ranked as the 17th most polluted river in the nation. The primary polluters were Pennsylvania iron and steel mills.

Recreation
The upper drainage area of the river basin is renowned for its water sports/hobbies of whitewater kayaking (and in some cases whitewater rafting) opportunities. The land here is of a very rugged plateau type which allows streams to gather sufficient water volume before they fall off the plateau and create challenging rapids. Some of the best known specific stream locations for this include:
Youghiogheny River at Ohiopyle, Pennsylvania
Youghiogheny River at Friendsville, Maryland
Cheat River at Albright, West Virginia
Tygart River at Belington, West Virginia

History

18th and 19th centuries
The Monongahela River valley was the site of a famous battle that was one of the first in the French and Indian War—the Braddock Expedition (May–July 1755). It resulted in a sharp defeat for two thousand British and Colonial forces against those of the French and their Native American allies.

In 1817, the Pennsylvania legislature authorized the Monongahela Navigation Company to build 16 dams with bypass locks to create a river transportation system between Pittsburgh and the area that would later become West Virginia. Originally planned to run as far south as the Cheat River, the system was extended to Fairmont, and bituminous coal from West Virginia was the chief product transported downstream. After a canal tunnel through Grant's Hill in Pittsburgh was completed in 1832, boats could travel between the Monongahela River and the Western Division Canal of Pennsylvania's principal east-west canal and railroad system, the Main Line of Public Works. In 1897, the federal government took possession of the Monongahela Navigation through condemnation proceedings. Later, the dam-lock combinations were increased in size and reduced in number.

Opening in 1850, it was destroyed by a flood in 1865.

During the 19th century and well into the twentieth, the Monongahela was heavily used by industry, and several U.S. Steel plants, including the Homestead Works, site of the Homestead Strike of 1892, were built along its banks.  Following the killing of several workers in the course of the strike, anarchist Emma Goldman wrote: "Words had lost their meaning in the face of the innocent blood spilled on the banks of the Monongahela." Other mills included the Edgar Thomson Works in Braddock, the first steel works in the area, the Duquesne Works and the Jones and Laughlin steel works on the South Side of Pittsburgh. Only the Edgar Thomson works remain producing steel along the river.

Despite the closure of many of the mills in the 1980s and 90s, the Monogahela is still an important waterway for industry. The Mon Valley Works of U.S. Steel operates three plants, including the Edgar Thomson plant for basic steel marking, the Irvin plant for steel finishing, and the Clairton plant for coke production. Coal barges are a common sight on the river, and the railways which line either side are heavily used by freight. Other industries include power generation, chemicals, and recycling.

20th century
Three ships in the United States Navy have been named Monongahela after the river.
In October 1930, severe drought caused the river flow to drop below , and in some places, it was possible to walk across the river bottom.

The river was the site of a famous airplane crash that has become the subject of urban legends and conspiracy theories. Early on the morning of January 31, 1956, a B-25 bomber en route from Nellis Air Force Base in Nevada to Olmsted Air Force Base in Pennsylvania crashed into the river near the Glenwood Bridge in Homestead, Pennsylvania. The six crewmen survived the initial crash, but two of them succumbed in the cold water and drowned. Despite the relatively shallow  water, the aircraft was never recovered and became known as the "ghost bomber". The Pittsburgh Post-Gazette published a graphical representation of the flight path and flight details in 1999. As of 2018, the bomber has not been found.

Gallery

See also
List of crossings of the Monongahela River
List of rivers of Pennsylvania
List of rivers of West Virginia
Geography of Pennsylvania

Notes and references

Bibliography
Bissell, Richard (1952), The Monongahela, Rinehart & Co.
Callahan, James Morton and Bernard Lee Butcher (1912), Genealogical and Personal History of the Upper Monongahela Valley, West Virginia, New York: Lewis Historical Publishing Company.
Core, Earl L. (1984), "The Monongalia River," in: Bartlett, Richard A. (ed), Rolling Rivers: An Encyclopedia of America's Rivers. New York: McGraw-Hill. . pp 149–52.
Core, Earl L. (1974–84), The Monongalia Story: A Bicentennial History, Parsons, W.Va.: McClain Printing Co., 5 volumes; an extensive, well-documented natural & human history of the Monongahela River basin.
Volume I: Prelude (1974)
Volume II: The Pioneers (1976)
Volume III: Discord (1979)
Volume IV: Industrialization (1984)
Volume V: Sophistication (1984)

External links

U.S. Geological Survey: PA stream gaging stations

 
Tributaries of the Ohio River
Rivers of Pennsylvania
Rivers of West Virginia
Rivers of Allegheny County, Pennsylvania
Rivers of Washington County, Pennsylvania
Rivers of Westmoreland County, Pennsylvania
Rivers of Fayette County, Pennsylvania
Rivers of Greene County, Pennsylvania
Rivers of Monongalia County, West Virginia
Rivers of Marion County, West Virginia
Water transportation in Pennsylvania
Water transportation in West Virginia
Allegheny Plateau